Einar Söderqvist (24 December 1921 – 14 April 1996) was a Swedish athlete. He competed in the men's hammer throw at the 1948 Summer Olympics.

References

External links
 

1921 births
1996 deaths
Athletes (track and field) at the 1948 Summer Olympics
Swedish male hammer throwers
Olympic athletes of Sweden
People from Örnsköldsvik Municipality
Sportspeople from Västernorrland County